In accounting, contingent liabilities are liabilities that may be incurred by an entity depending on the outcome of an uncertain future event such as the outcome of a pending lawsuit. These liabilities are not recorded in a company's accounts and shown in the balance sheet when both probable and reasonably estimable as 'contingency' or 'worst case' financial outcome.  A footnote to the balance sheet may describe the nature and extent of the contingent liabilities.  The likelihood of loss is described as probable, reasonably possible, or remote.  The ability to estimate a loss is described as known, reasonably estimable, or not reasonably estimable.  It may or may not occur.

Classification
According to International Monetary Fund's Government Finance Statistics Manual, contingent liabilities shall be classified as:

 Explicit contingent liabilities
 Guarantees
 One-off guarantees
 Loan and other debt instrument guarantees (publicly guaranteed debt)
 Other one-off guarantees
 Other explicit contingent liabilities
 Implicit contingent liabilities
 Net implicit obligations for future social security benefits
 Other implicit contingent liabilities

Examples
 Outstanding lawsuits
 Claims against the company not acknowledged as debts
 Legal liability
 Liquidated damages
 Tort
 Unliquidated damages
 Destruction by Flood
 product warranty
 Income Tax Disputed
 Sales Tax Disputed
 Financial guarantees given

References

Liability (financial accounting)